Donal O'Sullivan (31 December 1930 – 30 August 2001) was an Irish Gaelic footballer who played at club level with Lees and at inter-county level with the Cork senior football team. He usually lined out as a full-back. O'Sullivan, who is regarded as one of Cork's all-time greatest players, also served as a Gaelic Athletic Association administrator at county and inter-provincial levels.

Born in Cork, O'Sullivan was the son of Timothy O'Sullivan, a Fianna Fáil TD and Senator. His early football career included several seasons with University College Cork in the Sigerson Cup and with the Lees club with whom he won a Cork Senior Championship medal as captain in 1955.

O'Sullivan was later appointed captain of the Cork senior football team, leading the team to National League and Munster Championship successes in 1956. He also captained Cork to that year's All-Ireland final defeat by Galway. O'Sullivan also played Railway Cup football for Munster.

At the age of 21 O'Sullivan became a member of the Cork County Board and was elected vice-chairman in 1970 - occupying the position for five years. In his final year he was acting vice chairman before being elected to the position in his own right for a three-year term in 1976. O'Sullivan presided over one of the most successful eras for hurling in the modern era, with the Cork senior hurling team winning three successive All-Ireland Championships during his tenure. In 1980 he was chosen as chairman of the Munster Council.

O'Sullivan's grandsons, Niall and Rory Scannell, have represented Munster and Ireland in rugby union.

Honours

Lees
Cork Senior Football Championship (1): 1955 (c)

Cork
Munster Senior Football Championship (2): 1956, 1957
National Football League (1): 1955-56

References

1930 births
2001 deaths
Chairmen of county boards of the Gaelic Athletic Association
Chairmen of Gaelic games governing bodies
Cork County Board administrators
UCC Gaelic footballers
Lees Gaelic footballers
Cork inter-county Gaelic footballers
Munster inter-provincial Gaelic footballers
Munster Provincial Council administrators